Grünenberg was a medieval Swiss noble family.  The family was active from the middle of the 12th century until the 15th century in the Swiss Plateau, mostly in the Bernese Oberaargau.  There were two major branches, the Grimme and Schnabel lines which then further divided into other branches. Some of these branches owned land in Alsace and in southern Bavaria, especially in the Markgräflerland and in Breisgau.  About one hundred members of the family are known today.  The family name comes from Grünenberg Castle in Melchnau in the Canton of Bern.

History
The family was probably descended from the Langensteins. The earliest known members of the family were Walther I and Heinrich I, both of whom died before 1224. The two branches of the family were created in 1224. The founder of the younger Schnabel line, Markwart I, received the southern part of the family lands. Both branches of the family were allied with the Counts of Kyburg probably until the extinction of the Kyburg male line in 1264. The family gained some lands from the Kyburg inheritance as well as fiefs from the Habsburgs who inherited the majority of the Kyburg land. Both branches of the family remained supporters of the Habsburgs during the 13th and 14th centuries while the neighboring Old Swiss Confederation fought with the Austrian Habsburgs over land in the Swiss Plateau.

The Grimme line was further divided between the descendants of Johann the Grimme I and Arnold I though eventually the descendants of Johann became the main line. Through marriage they were related to a number of other noble families in the area including the Counts of Aarburg, Balm, Wolhusen and Aarwangen. The two branches of the Grimme line acquired towns, villages and churches throughout the region during the 14th century. However, by the late 14th century the Austrians had lost their power in Oberaargau and Bern was expanding rapidly. In 1407 Wilhelm Grünenberg accepted citizenship in the city of Bern and sold some of the estates to the city. In 1414 the Schnabel line died out with Hermann. In 1432 Wilhelm sold Aarwangen to Bern, gave up his citizenship in Bern and received Rheinfelden as a Habsburg imperial fief. He was an advisor to the Emperor Frederick III. He joined the Old Zürich War on the side of the Habsburgs. When he died by 1454, male line of the Grünenberg family ended.

Coat of arms
The coat of arms is an example of canting arms, since the name Grünenberg means Green mountain, it always included green mountains.  Normally there were six rounded mountains arraigned in a triangle with one then two then three mountains.  As a crest it often had feathers and sometimes a small hut appeared on the mountains.  The helmet cover is green on the outside and natural ermine on the interior.

In the Scheiblerschen Wappenbuch it is shown with golden margins around six green mountains.  The crest has a golden baron's coronet.

References

Literature
 
  ("Grundriss der Schlösser", p. 185)
 
 
  Edited from Schweizerische Heraldische Gesellschaft, Band I: Hoher Adel [Swiss Heraldic Society, Volume I: High nobility].

External links

 
  (Adelsherrschaft)
 Private Website over the Lords of Grünenberg
 Website of the Burgruine Grünenberg, Melchnau Foundation

History of Bern
Swiss noble families
Swiss nobility